Baba Yaga (released 1999 by the label Grappa Music - GMCD 4158) is a studio album by Annbjørg Lien.

Review 
With wisdom from tales about the Slavic witch Baba Yaga as an ideological superstructure, harding fiddler Annbjørg Lien is returning with an album out of the ordinary again. It appears in the musical landscape where pounding drums, whistles and synths around fill the air around her fiddle with exciting inventions.

Reception
The Allmusic reviewer Chris Nickson awarded the album 4.5 stars, and the review by Terje Mosnes of the Norwegian newspaper Dagbladet awarded the album dice 5.

Track listing 
«Loki» (4:31)
«Irianda» (3:29)
«Astra» (4:51)
«Ája» (6:47)
«Baba Yaga» (4:45)
«Old Larry» (4:29)
«January» (3:19)
«Ritual» (4:30)
«Inoque» (4:43)
«Wackidoo» (4:26)
«W.» (3:48)

Personnel 
Annbjørg Lien – fiddle & vocals
Arve Moen Bergset – violin
Terje Isungset – Jew's-harp
Roger Tallroth – bouzouki, guitar & mandola
Svein Dag Hauge – guitar
Bjørn Ole Rasch – keyboards & Mini Moog
Hans Fredrik Jacobsen – bagpipes, clarinet, flute & oud
Rune Arnesen - drums & percussion
Ailo Gaup - vocals (tracks: 4)

Credits 
Victor Boullet	- photography
Morten Lund - mastering
Drew Miller - graphic remix
Bjørn Ole Rasch - arranger, composer, producer & programming
Roger Tallroth - arranger

References 

Annbjørg Lien albums
1999 albums